János Hanzlik (born 14 April 1943) is a Hungarian weightlifter. He competed in the men's heavyweight event at the 1972 Summer Olympics.

References

External links
 

1943 births
Living people
Hungarian male weightlifters
Olympic weightlifters of Hungary
Weightlifters at the 1972 Summer Olympics
People from Oroszlány
Sportspeople from Komárom-Esztergom County
20th-century Hungarian people